Paddy Ryan (born 9 August 1988) is an Australian rugby union player who plays as a tight-head prop. Ryan played eight seasons for the New South Wales Waratahs, where he surpassed one hundred caps in Super Rugby. He was also capped for the Australian national team.

Early life
Ryan was born and raised in Tamworth in northern New South Wales. He went to St. Nicholas primary school before attending St Joseph's College, Hunters Hill in Sydney, Australia as a boarding student.

Professional rugby career
Ryan made his senior debut for the Waratahs during the 2011 Super Rugby season against the Chiefs. Leaving the Waratahs in 2018, Ryan subsequently played for the Munakata Sanix Blues in the Japan Rugby League One, and the San Diego Legion in Major League Rugby (MLR). Ryan re-signed for the Waratahs in 2022.

References

 http://www.inverelltimes.com.au/news/local/sport/rugby-union/rugby-players-benefit-from-waratahs-coaching/2432366.aspx

External links 
 Waratahs player profile
 itsrugby.co.uk profile
 Ryan's ESPN profile

1988 births
Living people
Australia international rugby union players
Australian expatriate rugby union players
Australian expatriate sportspeople in the United States
Barbarian F.C. players
Expatriate rugby union players in the United States
New South Wales Waratahs players
People educated at St Joseph's College, Hunters Hill
Rugby union props
San Diego Legion players
Rugby union players from New South Wales
Sydney Stars players
New South Wales Country Eagles players
Munakata Sanix Blues players
Black Rams Tokyo players